Pumarinri (possibly from Quechua puma cougar, puma, rinri ear, "puma ear") is a  mountain in the south of the Huayhuash mountain range in the Andes of Peru. It is located in the Lima Region, Cajatambo Province, Cajatambo District. Pumarinri lies at the Pumarinri valley, south of Cuyoc.

See also 
 Puka Qaqa

References

Mountains of Peru
Mountains of Lima Region